The Elizabethan Village was a tourist attraction at Bedfordale, Western Australia, created by British engineer Leo Fowler (1923–1992). It was opened in 1977 by Sir Charles Court, the Premier of Western Australia.  In 1978 it was awarded the Sir David Brand Award for Tourism.

It comprised facsimiles of several buildings from Stratford-upon-Avon including Shakespeare's Birthplace and Anne Hathaway's Cottage. 

 some of the buildings are still in use as the Last Drop Elizabethan, formerly Elizabethan Village Pub, Cobwebs restaurant and the Leo Fowler function centre.

The village is listed as a category D municipal heritage site by the Heritage Council of Western Australia.

References

External links
Youtube presentation about Elizabethan Village made by Leo Fowler's daughter

Armadale, Western Australia